David Branch (born September 26, 1981) is an American mixed martial artist currently competing in the Middleweight division of ONE Championship. A professional competitor since 2007, he has fought for the UFC, World Series of Fighting, Bellator, Shark Fights, and Titan FC. Branch is the former WSOF Light Heavyweight Champion and WSOF Middleweight Champion.

Background
Branch was born in Charlotte, North Carolina and raised in the Bronx, New York. He trained Karate for two and a half years before transitioning into Brazilian jiu-jitsu. He graduated from A. Philip Randolph Campus High School in New York, New York. Branch trained for three years with Michael Casey (black belt under Relson Gracie) in the Bronx, NY before he began training under the tutelage of MMA veteran, Renzo Gracie at his personal training center, and further developing his striking with Jason Strout (his first Head Coach) at Church Street Boxing Gym. Branch gained his black belt after learning from Gracie for about ten years. In addition to mixed martial arts, Branch has also competed in (and won) Brazilian jiu-jitsu titles in nationwide competitions.

Mixed martial arts career

Early career
Branch turned professional in MMA in 2007 and compiled an overall professional record of 3-0 before being signed by Bellator.

Bellator
Branch then signed for Bellator and made his promotional debut at Bellator 11 against Dennis Olson. Branch was victorious due to submission (rear-naked choke) at 1:27 of the first round.

Branch then competed in the UCC organization and defeated John Troyer via TKO (punches) at 4:26 of the second round.

Branch returned to Bellator at Bellator 15 and defeated Derrick Mehmen via submission (rear-naked choke) at 0:26 of the second round.

Ultimate Fighting Championship
In May 2010, Branch's coach Renzo Gracie announced that Branch had signed a four-fight contract with the UFC.
Branch made his debut on the undercard of UFC 116 against Gerald Harris. Branch was knocked out cold with a slam in the third round, losing for the first time in his professional career.

Branch was expected to face Aaron Simpson on September 15, 2010 at UFC Fight Night 22, but Simpson was forced to pull out of the bout with a staph infection. Branch instead fought Tomasz Drwal. Branch won the fight via unanimous decision, earning his first UFC victory.

Branch next defeated Rich Attonito at The Ultimate Fighter: Team GSP vs. Team Koscheck Finale via unanimous decision (30–27, 30–27, and 30–27).

Branch was rumored to face Dan Miller on March 19, 2011 at UFC 128. However, according to Dan's manager, the fight was not offered. Miller ended up facing a different opponent.

Branch next faced Rousimar Palhares on March 3, 2011 at UFC Live: Sanchez vs. Kampmann, replacing Alexandre Ferreira. Branch was defeated by Palhares when he tapped out to a kneebar early in the second round and was subsequently released from the promotion.

Independent promotions
Following his release from the UFC Branch signed to fight Jeremy May at Shark Fights 15: Villaseñor vs Camozzi. He won via TKO in the third round.

Branch next faced of against Strikeforce vet Dominique Steele at Pure MMA: The Beginning. He won via unanimous decision.

In his next fight Branch took on former UFC vet Anthony Johnson at Titan Fighting Championships 22. The bout was originally supposed to be fought at 185lbs, but both fighters came in overweight and the bout was changed to 195 lb catchweight fight. He lost via unanimous decision.

World Series of Fighting
In Branch's next fight he took on another former UFC vet Dustin Jacoby at the inaugural World Series of Fighting 1. He won via unanimous decision.

Branch next faced off against PRIDE legend Paulo Filho at World Series of Fighting 2. He won via unanimous decision.

On May 16, 2013, WSOF announced a four-man tournament to crown an Inaugural Middleweight Champion. Branch will be one of the four men entering this tournament. Joining Branch will be former UFC vet Jesse Taylor, current MFC Middleweight Champion Elvis Mutapčić, and former UFC vet Danillo Villefort. Branch took on Danillo Villefort in the open round of the tournament at WSOF 5. He won the fight via unanimous decision.

In the Middleweight Tournament Final, Branch faced Jesse Taylor at World Series of Fighting 10 on June 21, 2014. He won the fight via D'arce choke submission in the first round to become the inaugural World Series of Fighting Middleweight champion.

In his first title defense, Branch faced fellow UFC veteran Yushin Okami at WSOF 15 on October 24, 2014. He won the fight via technical knockout in the fourth round.

On March 5, 2015, it was announced that a semifinal fight of the WSOF Light Heavyweight Championship Tournament between Matt Hamill and Vinny Magalhães was canceled and then changed to a fight between WSOF Middleweight Championship David Branch and Ronny Markes for the second semifinal fight of the WSOF Light Heavyweight Championship tournament at the WSOF 20 on April 10, 2015. However, on the day of the weigh-in, Markes was forced out of the bout due to dehydration and was replaced by promotional newcomer Jesse McElligott. He won the fight via technical submission in the second round.

Branch defended the WSOF Light Heavyweight Championship against Vinny Magalhães at WSOF 33 on October 7, 2016 in the main event. He won the fight via unanimous decision.

Return to Ultimate Fighting Championship
On February 15, 2017, Branch announced that he had re-signed with the UFC and expects to be scheduled to compete in the middleweight division for the promotion by May.

Branch faced Krzysztof Jotko in his return to the UFC on May 13, 2017, at UFC 211. He won the fight via split decision.

Branch faced former UFC middleweight champion Luke Rockhold at UFC Fight Night 116 on September 16, 2017. Despite winning the first round, he lost the fight by a tap out due to strikes with 55 seconds remaining in the second round.

Branch was scheduled to face Yoel Romero on February 24, 2018 at UFC on Fox 28. However, on January 12, 2018, it was announced that Robert Whittaker was pulled from the middleweight title championship at UFC 221 and replaced by Romero.

Branch faced Thiago Santos on April 21, 2018 at UFC Fight Night 128. He won the fight via knockout in round one. This win earned him the Performance of the Night bonus.

Branch was expected to face Ronaldo Souza on November 3, 2018 at UFC 230. However on October 19, 2018 It was reported that Souza replaced injured Luke Rockhold who was scheduled to fight Chris Weidman in the event.  It was reported on October 19, 2018 that Jared Cannonier faced Branch instead. He lost the fight via technical knockout in round two.

Branch faced Jack Hermansson on March 30, 2019 at UFC on ESPN 2. He lost the fight via guillotine choke in the first round.

Branch was scheduled to face Andrew Sanchez on September 14, 2019 at UFC on ESPN+ 16. However, it was reported that Branch was forced to pull from the event due to injury and he was replaced by Marvin Vettori.

USADA violation and release from the UFC
In September 2019, it was revealed that Branch received a 2 year USADA suspension. He tested positive for Ipamorelin, a class of Peptide hormones and Growth Factors, detected in a urine sample he provided out-of-competition on May 24, 2019.  Sanction was made retroactive to July 26, 2019 and he is eligible to fight again in North America on July 26, 2021. Subsequently, Branch was officially released from the UFC on September 18, 2019.

Post-UFC career
After the release from the UFC, Branch faced Alexander Shlemenko at Russian Cagefighting Championship 7 on December 14, 2019. He lost the fight via a guillotine choke submission in the first round.

One Championship 
On January 25, 2022, it was announced that Branch had signed with ONE Championship. He was expected to make his promotional debut against Leandro Ataides at ONE Championship: Full Circle on February 25, 2022, but wasn't medically cleared to compete.

Personal life
Branch is the brother of professional boxers, Sechew Powell and Jamelle Hamilton.

Championships and accomplishments
Ultimate Fighting Championship
Performance of the Night (One time) vs. Thiago Santos
World Series of Fighting
WSOF Light Heavyweight Championship (One time)
One successful title defense 
WSOF Middleweight Championship (One time)
Three successful title defenses
WSOF Middleweight Championship Tournament Winner
WSOF Light Heavyweight Championship Tournament Winner
First fighter to hold Championships in multiple weight classes
Tied 2nd most wins in World Series of Fighting history (10) with Justin Gaethje
Most Submission wins in World Series of Fighting history (4)
Undefeated in World Series of Fighting (10-0)

Mixed martial arts record

|-
|Loss
|align=center|22–7
|Alexander Shlemenko
|Submission (guillotine choke)
|Russian Cagefighting Championship 7
|
|align=center|1
|align=center|4:58
|Yekaterinburg, Russia
|
|-
|Loss
|align=center|22–6
|Jack Hermansson
|Submission (guillotine choke)
|UFC on ESPN: Barboza vs. Gaethje 
|
|align=center|1
|align=center|0:49
|Philadelphia, Pennsylvania, United States
|-->
|-
|Loss
|align=center|22–5
|Jared Cannonier
|TKO (punches)
|UFC 230 
|
|align=center|2
|align=center|0:39
|New York City, New York, United States
|
|-
|Win
|align=center|22–4
|Thiago Santos
|KO (punches)
|UFC Fight Night: Barboza vs. Lee
|
|align=center|1
|align=center|2:30
|Atlantic City, New Jersey, United States
|
|-
|Loss
|align=center|21–4
|Luke Rockhold
|TKO (submission to punches)
|UFC Fight Night: Rockhold vs. Branch
|
|align=center|2
|align=center|4:05
|Pittsburgh, Pennsylvania, United States
|
|-
|Win
|align=center|21–3
|Krzysztof Jotko
|Decision (split)
|UFC 211
|
|align=center|3
|align=center|5:00
|Dallas, Texas, United States
|
|-
| Win
|align=center|20–3
|Louis Taylor
|Submission (rear-naked choke)
|WSOF 34
|
|align=center|5
|align=center|2:00
|New York City, New York, United States
|
|-
| Win
| align=center| 19–3
| Vinny Magalhães
| Decision (unanimous)
| WSOF 33
| 
| align=center| 5
| align=center| 5:00
| Kansas City, Missouri, United States
| 
|-
| Win
| align=center| 18–3
| Clifford Starks
| Decision (unanimous)
| WSOF 30
| 
| align=center| 5
| align=center| 5:00
| Las Vegas, Nevada, United States
| 
|-
| Win
| align=center| 17–3
| Teddy Holder
| Submission (rear-naked choke)
| WSOF 23
| 
| align=center| 1
| align=center| 2:21
| Phoenix, Arizona, United States
| 
|-
| Win
| align=center| 16–3
| Jesse McElligott
| Technical Submission (Von Flue choke)
| WSOF 20
| 
| align=center| 2
| align=center| 1:28
| Mashantucket, Connecticut, United States
| 
|-
| Win
| align=center| 15–3
| Yushin Okami
| TKO (punches)
| WSOF 15
| 
| align=center| 4
| align=center| 3:39
| Tampa, Florida, United States
| 
|-
| Win
| align=center| 14–3
| Jesse Taylor
| Submission (D'Arce choke)
| WSOF 10
| 
| align=center| 1
| align=center| 1:41
| Las Vegas, Nevada, United States
| 
|-
| Win
| align=center| 13–3
| Danillo Villefort 
| Decision (unanimous)
| WSOF 5
| 
| align=center| 3
| align=center| 5:00 
| Atlantic City, New Jersey, United States
| 
|-
| Win
| align=center| 12–3
| Paulo Filho 
| Decision (unanimous)
| WSOF 2
| 
| align=center| 3
| align=center| 5:00
| Atlantic City, New Jersey, United States
| 
|-
| Win
| align=center| 11–3
| Dustin Jacoby
| Decision (unanimous)
| WSOF 1
| 
| align=center| 3
| align=center| 5:00
| Las Vegas, Nevada, United States
| 
|-
| Loss
| align=center| 10–3
| Anthony Johnson
| Decision (unanimous)
| Titan FC 22
| 
| align=center| 3
| align=center| 5:00
| Kansas City, Kansas, United States
| 
|-
| Win
| align=center| 10–2
| Dominique Steele
| Decision (unanimous)
| Pure MMA: The Beginning
| 
| align=center| 3
| align=center| 5:00
| Plains, Pennsylvania, United States
| 
|-
| Win
| align=center| 9–2
| Jeremy May
| TKO (punches)
| Shark Fights 15: Villaseñor vs Camozzi
| 
| align=center| 3
| align=center| 3:19
| Rio Rancho, New Mexico, United States
| 
|-
| Loss
| align=center| 8–2
| Rousimar Palhares
| Submission (kneebar)
| UFC Live: Sanchez vs. Kampmann
| 
| align=center| 2
| align=center| 1:44
| Louisville, Kentucky, United States
| 
|-
| Win
| align=center| 8–1
| Rich Attonito
| Decision (unanimous)
| The Ultimate Fighter: Team GSP vs. Team Koscheck Finale
| 
| align=center| 3
| align=center| 5:00
| Las Vegas, Nevada, United States
| 
|-
| Win
| align=center| 7–1
| Tomasz Drwal
| Decision (unanimous)
| UFC Fight Night: Marquardt vs. Palhares
| 
| align=center| 3
| align=center| 5:00
| Austin, Texas, United States
| 
|-
| Loss
| align=center| 6–1
| Gerald Harris
| KO (slam)
| UFC 116
| 
| align=center| 3
| align=center| 2:35
| Las Vegas, Nevada, United States
| 
|-
| Win
| align=center| 6–0
| Derrick Mehmen
| Submission (rear-naked choke)
| Bellator 15
| 
| align=center| 2
| align=center| 0:26
| Uncasville, Connecticut, United States
| 
|-
| Win
| align=center| 5–0
| John Troyer
| TKO (punches)
| UCC 1: Merciless
| 
| align=center| 2
| align=center| 4:26
| Jersey City, New Jersey, United States
| 
|-
| Win
| align=center| 4–0
| Dennis Olson
| Submission (rear-naked choke)
| Bellator 11
| 
| align=center| 1
| align=center| 2:27
| Uncasville, Connecticut, United States
| 
|-
| Win
| align=center| 3–0
| Robby Huston
| Submission (rear-naked choke)
| DCF: Battle at the Nation's Capital
| 
| align=center| 2
| align=center| 2:41
| Washington D.C., United States
| 
|-
| Win
| align=center| 2–0
| Alex Aquino
| TKO (doctor stoppage)
| Ring of Combat 19
| 
| align=center| 1
| align=center| 3:29
| Atlantic City, New Jersey, United States
| 
|-
| Win
| align=center| 1–0
| Craig Simone
| TKO (punches)
| Cage Fights 6
| 
| align=center| 1
| align=center| 1:44
| Fort Myers, Florida, United States
|

References

External links
 
 
 

1981 births
Living people
African-American mixed martial artists
American male mixed martial artists
Mixed martial artists from New York (state)
Middleweight mixed martial artists
Mixed martial artists utilizing Brazilian jiu-jitsu
American practitioners of Brazilian jiu-jitsu
People awarded a black belt in Brazilian jiu-jitsu
Ultimate Fighting Championship male fighters
Doping cases in mixed martial arts
21st-century African-American sportspeople
20th-century African-American people